James Archibald Meriwether (September 20, 1806 – April 18, 1852) was a United States Representative, jurist and lawyer from Georgia. His uncle was U.S. Representative James Meriwether.

Early years and education
Meriwether was born near Washington, Georgia, on September 20, 1806, to James and Susannah Hatcher Meriweather. He graduated from the University of Georgia (UGA) in Athens with a Bachelor of Arts (AB) degree in 1826.

Legal career and military service
After studying law and gaining admittance to the state bar, he practiced law in Eatonton, Georgia. He was also captain of a volunteer unit during the Seminole Wars.

Political service
From 1831 to 1836 and again in 1838, Meriwether served in the Georgia House of Representatives as a representative of Clarke County. From 1845 to 1849, he served as a judge of the superior court for the Eatonton (Ocmulgee) district . In 1840, he  was elected as a Whig Representative from Georgia to the 27th United States Congress and served one term from March 4, 1841, until March 3, 1843. He returned to the Georgia House in for one term in 1843. In 1851 he was once again elected to the Georgia House of Representatives, and served as Speaker of that body in 1852.

Personal life
Meriwether married Rebecca Carleton McKigney, and together the couple had eight children who survived past childhood.

Death
Meriwether died on April 18, 1852, in Eatonton and was buried in that city's Union Cemetery.

See also
 List of speakers of the Georgia House of Representatives

References

External links
 

 Letter dated April 25, 1852 reporting the sudden death of Judge James Archibald Meriwether
 History of the University of Georgia, Thomas Walter Reed,  Imprint:  Athens, Georgia : University of Georgia, ca. 1949, pp. 215–216
 

1806 births
1852 deaths
Members of the Georgia House of Representatives
Georgia (U.S. state) lawyers
Georgia (U.S. state) state court judges
University of Georgia alumni
American people of the Seminole Wars
People from Wilkes County, Georgia
Whig Party members of the United States House of Representatives from Georgia (U.S. state)
People from Eatonton, Georgia
American slave owners
19th-century American politicians
19th-century American judges
19th-century American lawyers